The women's singles competition in artistic roller skating at the 2009 World Games took place from 21 to 22 July 2009 at the I-Shou University Gymnasium in Kaohsiung, Taiwan.

Competition format
A total of 6 skaters entered the competition. Short program and long program were held.

Results

References 

 
2009 World Games